Stenoptilia scoprodactyla is a moth of the family Pterophoridae. It is found in Russia.

References

Moths described in 1986
scoprodactyla
Moths of Asia